Subbotin is a lunar impact crater that is located to the west of the larger crater Pavlov, and to the east-northeast of Lampland. Subbotin lies on the far side of the Moon, and can only be viewed from lunar orbit. It was named after the Soviet mathematician and astronomer Mikhail Subbotin.

Since its formation, this crater has been heavily battered by smaller impacts, leaving the outer rim worn and marked by several small craterlets. This pattern of impact extends into the interior floor, where there are multiple small craterlets. A short chain of these impacts begins in the northwest part of the interior and curves back to extend across the northern rim.

Satellite craters 

By convention these features are identified on lunar maps by placing the letter on the side of the crater midpoint that is closest to Subbotin.

See also 
 1692 Subbotina, minor planet

References 

 
 
 
 
 
 
 
 
 
 
 
 

Impact craters on the Moon